This Hostel Life is a novel by Nigerian writer Melatu Uche Okorie, it was published in 2018 by Skein Press in Ireland. It is the first novel by the writer. The novel features an invented Nigerian pidgin English patois. It was launched at the International Literature Festival, where Okorie discussed the migrant experience with Nikesh Shukla. This Hostel Life was bought by Virago Press in 2019, and adapted into an operatic work by the Irish National Opera.

References 

2018 Nigerian novels
2019 Irish novels